Sulfotransferases (SULTs) are transferase enzymes that catalyze the transfer of a sulfo group from a donor molecule to an acceptor alcohol or amine. The most common sulfo group donor is  3'-phosphoadenosine-5'-phosphosulfate (PAPS). In the case of alcohol as acceptor, the product is a sulfate (R-OSO3−), whereas an amine leads to a sulfamate (R-NH-SO3−). Both reactive groups for a sulfonation via sulfotransferases may be part of a protein, lipid, carbohydrate or steroid.

Examples
The following are examples of sulfotransferases:

 carbohydrate sulfotransferase: CHST1, CHST2, CHST3, CHST4, CHST5, CHST6, CHST7, CHST8, CHST9, CHST10, CHST11, CHST12, CHST13, CHST14
 galactose-3-O-sulfotransferase: GAL3ST1, GAL3ST2, GAL3ST3, GAL3ST4
 heparan sulfate 2-O-sulfotransferase: HS2ST1
 heparan sulfate 3-O-sulfotransferase: HS3ST1, HS3ST2, HS3ST3A1, HS3ST3B1, HS3ST4, HS3ST5, HS3ST6
 heparan sulfate 6-O-sulfotransferase: HS6ST1, HS6ST2, HS6ST3
 N-deacetylase/N-sulfotransferase: NDST1, NDST2, NDST3, NDST4
 tyrosylprotein sulfotransferase: TPST1, TPST2
 uronyl-2-sulfotransferase
 Estrone sulfotransferase
 Chondroitin 4-sulfotransferase
 other: SULT1A1, SULT1A2, SULT1A3, SULT1A4, SULT1B1, SULT1C2, SULT1C3, SULT1C4, SULT1D1P, SULT1E1, SULT2A1, SULT2B1, SULT4A1, SULT6B1

See also
 List of EC numbers (EC 2)#EC 2.8.2: Sulfotransferases
 Wikipedia:MeSH D08#MeSH D08.811.913.817 --- sulfur group transferases .28EC 2.8.29

References

External links